Parkerioideae, synonym Ceratopteridoideae, is one of the five subfamilies in the fern family Pteridaceae. It includes only the two genera Acrostichum and Ceratopteris. The following diagram shows a likely phylogenic relationship between the two Parkerioideae genera and the other Pteridaceae subfamilies.

References

Pteridaceae
Plant subfamilies